Horace Rice defeated Harry Parker, 6–3, 6–4, 6–4, in the final to win the men's singles tennis title at the 1907 Australasian Championships. The event (now known as the Australian Open) was a tennis tournament played on Grass courts in Brisbane, Australia. The tournament was held from 18 to 24 August

Main draw

Finals

Top half

Bottom half

References

External links
  Grand Slam Tennis Archive – Australasian Open 1907
 

Men's Singles
1907 in Australian tennis